Sarah Penner is an American author. Her debut novel, The Lost Apothecary, is a New York Times best seller.

Personal life 
Penner was born and raised in northeast Kansas.

She attended the University of Kansas and graduated with a degree in finance. She currently works in finance full-time and is a member of Historical Novel Society and the Women’s Fiction Writers Association.

Penner currently lives in Florida with her husband Marc and their miniature dachshund Zoe.

The Lost Apothecary 
The Lost Apothecary is a New York Times bestseller, published March 2, 2021 by Park Row Books.

The book received positive reviews from NPR, Booklist, and Library Journal, as well as a mixed review from Publishers Weekly. Reader's Digest and Cosmopolitan included it in their lists of the best books for the year.

In 2021, it was nominated for a Goodreads Choice Award for Historical Fiction and for Debut Novel.

Fox Broadcasting Company is currently working on adapting the book into a television drama series.

References 

Living people
People from Kansas
People from Florida
University of Kansas alumni
American mystery writers
American historical fiction writers
Year of birth missing (living people)